Tucupit Point is a prominent sandstone pinnacle in the Kolob Canyons area of Zion National Park in Washington County, Utah, United States.

Description
The formation lays off of Taylor Creek Trail, and rises with a prominence of 138 feet. The pinnacle - visible from U.S. Route 40  to the west - has been the subject of numerous photographs. American artist Thomas Moran viewed the pinnacle in 1873 while travelling south from Salt Lake City, with the artist later rendering a famous watercolor of the feature. The pinnacle was then named "Colburn's Butte" after Justin Colburn, a correspondent for the New York Times travelling with Moran; it would later be renamed Tucupit Point, "Tucupit" being the Paiute word for wildcat.

See also

 List of mountains in Utah
 Paria Point
 Beatty Point

References

External links

Landforms of Washington County, Utah
Landmarks in Utah
Rock formations of Utah
Zion National Park